The Actual Ground Position Line (AGPL) divides current positions of Indian and Pakistani military posts and troops across the entire  long front line in the disputed region of Siachen Glacier. AGPL generally runs along the Saltoro Mountains range, beginning from the northernmost point of the (LOC) at Point NJ 9842 and 
A cease-fire was announced in 2003.

India has at least 108 forward military outposts and artillery observation posts in this area where temperature goes down to  during winters with icy 300 km/h blizzards. Bana Top is the highest post and requires an  trek that takes up to 20 days for troops to reach. Pahalwan Post, and Indira Col, are other high posts. India has two major bases, each with a brigade strength of five to eight battalions supported by additional artillery, air defence, engineer and other logistic units: Thoise which serves the southern Siachen sector, and Siachen Base Camp which serves the northern and middle sectors of Siachen. Kumar Post, a logistics subbase of Siachen Base Camp, is a  9-day return trek from Siachen Base camp towards Indira Col. India has significant tactical advantage as it occupies most of the higher peaks on the Saltoro Mountain Range in the western sector of Siachen. The Pakistani Army hold posts at lower heights on the western slopes of the spurs of the Saltoro Ridge. Pakistan has not been able to scale the crest of the Saltoro Range occupied by India. Each post has an artillery officer who are deployed in the rotation of 45 days. The average temperature is between minus 25°C during day and minus 55°C during the night. As of 2013, Siachen operations cost INR 3,000 crore annually where over 850 Indian and over 1,800 Pakistani soldiers have died, mostly not in combat, but due to the weather conditions.

Till 2013, 26 decorations have been awarded to the Indian soldiers in this sectors, including a Paramvir Chakra (PVC), five Mahavir Chakra and 20 Vir Chakra to 11 officers and 15 OR of which nine are posthumous. Additionally, many more Kirti Chakra, Shaurya Chakra, Sena Medal and Vayu Sena Medal have been awarded  in this sectors.

The actual India-Pakistan boundary is divided into four types of borders: disputed Sir Creek (SC) riverine border, mutually agreed India–Pakistan International Border (IB) from north of Sir Creek to north of Dhalan near Jammu, LoC across disputed Kashmir and Ladakh regions from north of Dhalan in India and west of Chicken's Neck in Pakistan to Point NJ9842, and Actual Ground Position Line (AGPL) across Siachen from Point NJ9842 to Indira Col West. Siachen lies south of the Shaksgam ceded by Pakistan to China via the 1963 Sino-Pakistan Agreement but also claimed by India and Aksai Chin held by China since 1962 but also claimed by India.

AGPL alignment

AGPL alignment, from south to north, runs near the following features of the Saltoro Mountains subrange of Karakoram:

 AGPL Starting Point is NJ9842 (peak); the Line of Control ends and the AGPL begins here and runs northwards.
 East of Pakistan-held Chulung Glacier
 Southeast of Gharkun (peak, 6620 m), held by Pakistan
 West of India-held glaciers and La Yongma Ri, 6828 m  
 Northeast of Pakistan-held Gyong Glacier
 Gyong Kangri (peak, 6727 m) 
 Gyong La (pass), held by India
 East of Gyari (valley) Pakistani army base camp
 Chumik Kangri (peak, 675 4m)
 K12 (peak, 7,428 m), held by India
 West of Bilafond La, held by India
 West of Bana Top (peak), formerly Quaid Post of Pakistan, the highest post in the region at 20,500 ft two km south of Bilafond La, held by India since 1987 after the Operation Rajiv. Sonam post sits between Amar and Bana posts. 
 Saltoro Kangri, 7,742 m, 10 km northwest of Bana Top, twin peaks of Saltoro Kangri I at 25,400 ft to south and Saltoro Kangri II at a lower height to the north. It is the highest peak in the Siachen sector, now held by India.
 Sherpi Kangri, twin peaks 6 km south of Ghent Kangri (7,380 m) and 10 km northwest of Saltoro Kangri (7,742 m). Sherpi Kangri I is the higher, western summit at 7380 m. Sherpi Kangri II at approximately 7100 m is further east, it is on AGPL, unmanned. 
 West of Ghent Kangri 7380 m, held by India
 West of Sia La, held by India
 East of Baltoro Kangri 7312 m, held by Pakistan 
 West of Tiger Saddle, 6.5 km northwest of Sia La, held by India
 West of Conway Saddle, west of and opposite to Tiger Saddle, held by Pakistan
 East of Sia Kangri, west of Tiger saddle, held by Pakistan
 West of Indira Col on Indira Ridge, on the border of Indian and Chinese controlled territory.
  AGPL End Point: AGPL ends on the Indira Ridge at the India-China-Pakistan LAC tripoint near Sia Kangri 4 km northwest of Indira Col West.

History

Karachi Agreement and Shimla Agreement 

The Karachi Agreement of 1949 created the Line of Control between India and Pakistan, but this line ended at a location called Khor in Nubra. The only additional relevant text for the Saltoro – Siachen area in either the 1949 or the superseding 1972 Simla Agreement was "thence north to the glaciers."  The countries interpreted that differently, leading to the Siachen conflict.

1972 delineation 
As part of the Simla Agreement signed on 2 July 1972, prime ministers Indira Gandhi and Zulfikar Ali Bhutto agreed that "the line of control resulting from the ceasefire of December 17, 1971, shall be respected by both sides without prejudice to the recognised position of either side".

In November–December 1972, the military delegations of the two sides met in Suchetgarh to delineate the Line of Control. After delineation, signed maps were exchanged by the two sides and submitted to the respective governments for ratification. Scholar Brian Cloughley remarked that the delineation represented remarkable territorial precision. However, it terminated at the grid reference NJ9842, leaving undelimited 60 to 75 km to the border with China.

1984 capture of Siachen by India 

In 1984 by India's successful captured the disputed Siachen Glacier through its Operation Meghdoot, and subsequently continued with Operation Rajiv. India took control of the  Siachen Glacier and its tributary glaciers, as well as all the main passes and heights of the Saltoro Ridge immediately west of the glacier, including Sia La, Bilafond La, and Gyong La. Pakistan controls the glacial valleys and slopes immediately west of the Saltoro Ridge.

Current status

Army deployment 

Indian soldiers, following the often-internationally accepted principal of the highest watershed (mountain peaks and ridges) as the border, have held all of the Siachen Glacier and all its main passes since 1984. India launched Operation Meghdoot in 1984 during the Siachen conflict, and took control of the Siachen Glacier.

Indian Army posts are along the Saltoro Ridge, west of the main Siachen glacier, along a line roughly connecting Gyong La, Bilafond La, Sia La, and Indira Col. Pakistan controls the region west of Saltoro Ridge. India has more than 50 Indian military posts across the length of AGPL which are located almost 3,000 ft above Pakistani posts, with 80 km line of sight visibility range in the clear weather. The Indian soldiers hold on to the heights on the ridge, preventing the Pakistani soldiers from climbing up to the Saltoro Range heights.

The Pakistan Army has base camps at Goma and posts at its Gayari subsector in the sub glaciers southwest of the Saltoro Range, and access on the Baltoro Glacier to the Conway Saddle in the northern extremes of the region.  The peaks and passes under Pakistan's control such as Gayari Camp, Chogolisa, Baltoro Glacier, Conway Saddle, Baltoro Muztagh, and Gasherbrum lie west of the AGPL.

Tourism  

India allows several tourist and civilian activities in Siachen area. To exploit the potential for tourism, the government is making ongoing efforts to improve connectivity. There is a recurring planned annual civilian expedition from Siachen Base Camp to Indira Ridge, Indira Col and other features. India has opened up the entire area from Siachen Base Camp at 12,000 ft to Kumar Post at 15,000 ft for the regular tourism for the civilians. Bana Post at 20,500 ft will remain off limit to tourists. Temperatures drop to below minus 60 degrees Celsius during the winter.

Until 2010, civilian tourists were permitted only in the Nubra Valley up to Panamik. Since 2010 tourist have been permitted in Nubra Valley up to Turtuk and beyond to Tyakshi on the LAC; both of these villages were captured from Pakistan by India in Indo-Pakistani War of 1971. From 2019, medically fit civilians below the age of 45 are allowed up to Kumar Base (16,000 ft) on a 30-day trek organised by Army Adventure Cell in August–September, during which tourists go through the highly altitude conditioning at Leh Base, Siachen Base and forward staging posts, at the end of which they undertake an extreme adventure 9-day return track from Siachen Base to Kumar Base 60 km away.

In 2018, five road routes and four trails with a night stay in Ladakh were opened for the tourists by the Government of India (GoI), all located above the altitude of 14,000 ft, and the maximum limit of travel permit was raised from 7 days to 15 days:

See also

 Borders
 India–Pakistan International Border (IB)
 Line of Control (LoC)
 Line of Actual Control (LAC)
 Sir Creek (SC)
 Borders of China
 Borders of India
 
 Conflicts
 Kashmir conflict
 Siachen conflict
 Sino-Indian conflict
 List of disputed territories of China
 List of disputed territories of India
 List of disputed territories of Pakistan
 Northern Areas
 Trans-Karakoram Tract

 Operations
 Operation Meghdoot, by India
 Operation Rajiv, by India
 Operation Safed Sagar, by India

 Other related topics
 Awards and decorations of the Indian Armed Forces
 Bana Singh, after whom Quaid Post was renamed to Bana Top 
 Dafdar, westernmost town in Trans-Karakoram Tract
 India-China Border Roads
 List of AGLs
 List of extreme points of India
 Sino-Pakistan Agreement for transfer of Trans-Karakoram Tract to China

References 

Borders of Pakistan
Kashmir conflict
India–Pakistan border